The Croatian First League season of 1942 was the second held in the Independent State of Croatia. Regional group stages were carried out, before a playoff system began. Concordia Zagreb was declared champion.

Group A

Group B

Group C

Group D

Semifinals 
HŠK Concordia Zagreb - SAŠK Sarajevo: 2-1, 9-1     
HŠK Gradjanski Zagreb - HŠK Hajduk Osijek: 5-1, 1-3

Finals 
HŠK Concordia Zagreb - HŠK Gradjanski Zagreb: 6-2, 1-3

Champions
Concordia Zagreb (Coach: Bogdan Cuvaj)
Zvonko MonsiderToni KrammerBranko PavisaKrešimir PukšecSlavko PavleticZvonko JazbecSlavko BedaVinko GolobKarlo MuradoriSlavko KodrnjaViktor Ajbek

External links
Croatia Domestic Football Full Tables

Croatian First league seasons
Croatia
Croatia
1